Daniele Ferri (born 7 March 1992) is an Italian footballer who plays as a forward for Faenza.

Career

Cesena
Ferri started his professional career with A.C. Cesena. Ferri made his professional debut (and Serie B) on 23 January 2010 against Gallipoli. He substituted Ezequiel Schelotto in the 84th minute. Ferri did not play any game in 2010–11 Serie A. Ferri also spent 2 seasons with the reserve. He scored 5 goals in 2010–11 season, which already the club second topscorer, behind Alejandro Rodríguez.

In July 2011 Ferri left for fourth division newcomer Santarcangelo along with some Cesena half-owned to full-owned players: Rivolino Gavoci (Cesena only), Kadir Caidi (Bologna/Cesena), Giacomo Bassoli (Cesena/Bologna) and renewed the loan of Angelo Gregorio, Simone Tonelli and Nicola Del Pivo, which Gregorio and Tonelli now co-owned with Parma and Vicenza respectively.

Ferri just made 9 starts in 19 league appearances with 2 goals. He also booked 2 times. Santarcangelo finished as the 8th in the Group B of the fourth division. On 28 June 2012, Cesena sold Del Pivo and followed by Ferri on 29 June.

Brescia
On 29 June 2012, one day before the closure of 2011–12 financial year of "Brescia Calcio SpA" and "AC Cesena SpA", both clubs made a notional swap deal, a déjà vu of June 2011. It saw Ferri moved to Brescia in a 4-year deal and Brescia youngster O'Neal Ephraim moved to Cesena, both in co-ownership deals. Both 50% registration rights of the players were tagged for €1.2 million. Once again both club benefited from the swap deal in a short term to cover its financial crisis but mostly damaged by the future heavy amortization cost with impaired players resold value and/or performance, as the clubs bought a player with speculative price.

He left for Forlì, re-joining Cesena player Mattia Filippi and Leonardo Arrigoni. Ferri played for the club on 1 August 2012 in a friendly match. Ferri signed a 4-year contract.

Ferri returned to Brescia on 1 July 2013. He failed to find any club to borrow him in the first half of 2013–14 season. On 31 January 2014 he was signed by A.C. Pavia. In June 2014 the co-ownership of Manuel Canini and Ferri were renewed. Ferri failed to find a club in the first half of the season again, which he was sent to Slovenia along with Matteo Boccaccini on 1 February 2015, for ND Gorica. In June 2015 Brescia acquired Ferri outright from Cesena; Cesena acquired Ephraim and Nicolò Lini outright.

Ferri was an unused bench in 2015–16 Coppa Italia, as no.25 of the first team. He was signed by Tre Fiori along with Emanuele Fonte before the closure of the transfer window.

Lentigione
Ahead of the 2019/20 season, Ferri joined Lentigione Calcio.

Notes

References

External links
 Football.it Profile 
 
 
 Daniele Ferri at TuttoCampo

1992 births
Living people
People from Forlì
Italian footballers
Italian expatriate footballers
Italian expatriates
Footballers from Emilia-Romagna
Sportspeople from the Province of Forlì-Cesena
Association football midfielders
A.C. Cesena players
Santarcangelo Calcio players
Brescia Calcio players
Forlì F.C. players
F.C. Pavia players
ND Gorica players
S.P. Tre Fiori players
S.S.D. Axys Zola players
A.S.D. Mezzolara players
Serie B players
Serie C players
Serie D players
Italian expatriate sportspeople in Slovenia
Italian expatriate sportspeople in San Marino
Expatriate footballers in San Marino
Expatriate footballers in Slovenia
Italian expatriates in Slovenia